Gilles Simon was the defending champion, but chose not to participate.
Guillermo García-López, who eliminated World No.1 Rafael Nadal in the semifinal, won in the final against Jarkko Nieminen, 6–4, 3–6, 6–4 to become the first Spanish winner of this event.

Seeds

Main draw

Finals

Top half

Bottom half

References
 Main Draw
 Qualifying Draw

Singles
PTT Thailand Open - Singles
 in Thai tennis